Faye Beverley McMillan  (born 24 March 1971) is a Wiradjuri yin (woman) from Trance. She is an Australian academic and pharmacist known for her work on improving Indigenous healthcare. She is a Senior Atlantic Fellow for Social Equity (Atlantic Institute), as well as being a Senior Fellow with Advance HE. She is a founding member of Indigenous Allied Health Australia (IAHA) and was a board member of IAHA from 2009-2017 (and chairperson from 2010-2016). She joined UNSW at the start of March 2021 with over 20 years of experience in the Higher Education Sector and over 30 years in the health sector.

Early life, education, and qualifications 
McMillan is Wiradjuri and was born in Bowral, New South Wales. She grew up in Trangie, New South Wales. She graduated from Charles Sturt University with a Bachelor of Pharmacy in 2001, and completed her pre-registration year at Wagga Wagga.

 2020    Diploma of Counselling 
 2020    Cert IV Training and Assessment 
 2019    Senior Fellow, Advance Higher Education (SFHEA)
 2018    Graduate Certificate in Education – University of Melbourne 
 2016    Doctor of Health Science – Exegesis: Shared meanings of leadership through accounts of the experiences of Indigenous/First Nations women leaders” Charles Sturt University
 2016    Graduate Certificate in Wiradjuri Language, Culture and Heritage - Charles Sturt University
 2014    Graduate Certificate in Indigenous Governance - University of Arizona
 2013    Cert I and II – Wiradjuri Language 
 2006    Master of Indigenous Health Studies - University of Wollongong
 2001    Bachelor of Pharmacy - Charles Sturt University.

Career 
McMillan is known for having been Australia's first registered Aboriginal pharmacist. She has worked on the Tiwi Islands and in Vancouver, Canada. She is an Atlantic Fellow, focusing her work on supporting mental health, and a founding member and former chairperson of Indigenous Allied Health Australia. She has been involved in the Closing the Gap steering committee since 2013.

McMillan works at The University of New South Wales and works between Sydney and Wagga Wagga - Associate Professor of Aboriginal and Torres Strait Islander Health  and as Associate Professor in the School of Nursing, Midwifery and Indigenous Health.

McMillan is currently one of two Deputy National Rural Health Commissioners within the Office of the National Rural Health Commissioner.

In 2019, McMillian was appointed director of The Australian Pharmacy board.

Awards 

 McMillan was named in the Westpac and Australian Financial Review 100 Women of Influence Awards in 2014. 
 She was named 2019 New South Wales Aboriginal Woman of the Year.
 McMillan was awarded the 2021 Queen's Birthday Honours
 In 2021, McMillan was appointed a Member of the Order of Australia for "significant service to Indigenous mental health, and to tertiary education".

Selected publications 

 F McMillan, D Kampers, V Traynor, J Dewing; (2010) Person-centred care as caring for country: An indigenous Australia Experience; Dementia, 9 , (2): 163-167.
 C. Schultz, R. Walker, D. Bessarab, F. McMillan, J. MacLeod, R. Marriott (2014) Chapter 13: Interdisciplinary Care to Enhance Mental Health and Social Emotional Wellbeing.
 Y. Akama, D. Evans, S. Keen, F. McMillan, M McMillan, P. West; (2017) Designing digital and creative scaffolds to strengthen Indigenous nations: being Wiradjuri by practicing sovereignty; Digital Creativity, 28 , (1): 58-72. Doi: https://www.tandfonline.com/doi/full/10.1080/14626268.2017.1291525
 M. McMillan, F. McMillan, S. Rigney; (2016) Is indigenous National Building capable of strengthening and improving Indigenous holistic health outcomes: Retelling the right to health 10 , (2): 147-159.

References

External links 
 

1971 births
Living people
Members of the Order of Australia
Wiradjuri people
Indigenous Australian women academics 
Indigenous Australian academics 
Indigenous Australian health professionals
Charles Sturt University alumni
Australian pharmacists
Women pharmacists
Academic staff of the University of New South Wales
Australian women academics
Australian scientists
Australian women scientists
Indigenous Australian scientists